Grímsnes- og Grafningshreppur is a municipality in the south-western part of Iceland, in the Southern Region. It was formed in 1998 by the merger of Grímsneshreppur and Grafningshreppur. The main settlement is Sólheimar with 80 inhabitants (2006). The settlement Írafoss og Ljósafoss , which still had 15 inhabitants in 1997, has been abandoned since then.

References

External links

Municipalities of Iceland